In chemistry an antimonate is a compound which contains a metallic element, oxygen, and antimony in an oxidation state of +5. These compounds adopt polymeric structures with M-O-Sb linkages. They can be considered to be derivatives of the hypothetical antimonic acid H3SbO4, or combinations of metal oxides and antimony pentoxide, Sb2O5.

Historically these compounds were assumed to be analogous to the phosphates and formulas such as LiSbO3·3H2O and Na2H2Sb2O7·5H2O were used and the compounds described as hydrated meta-antimonates and pyro-antimonates. LiSbO3·3H2O is now known to be LiSb(OH)6 and contain the  anion and that Na2H2Sb2O7·5H2O is actually NaSb(OH)6.

Some examples of antimonates and their structures are shown below:
Li3SbO4 has a NaCl superstructure with isolated  units.
Sodium antimonate, NaSbO3, has the ilmenite structure, with hexagonal close packed oxide ions with each ion, Na+ and Sb5+ occupying a third of the octahedral sites.
MgSb2O6 has the trirutile structure, which is similar to the rutile structure except that there are two different cations in the lattice.
AlSbO4 has the rutile structure with random occupancy.
Lead antimonate, Pb2Sb2O7, Naples yellow, has the pyrochlore structure.
Calcium antimonate, Ca2Sb2O7, has the weberite structure.
Ferric ortho-antimonate, Fe2O3·Sb2O5 or FeSbO4, has the rutile structure with random occupancy.

Antimonate in chemical nomenclature
IUPAC recommendations are that compounds with anions containing antimony(V) have the antimonate(V) suffix or antimonate followed by a charge number, for example the  ion would be called hexahydridoxidoantimonate(V) or alternatively hexahydroxidoantimonate(1−).

See also
Antimonate mineral
Antimonide
Antimonite

References

Antimony(V) compounds
Oxyanions
Oxometallates